Tachyoryctes is a genus of rodent in the family Spalacidae.
It contains the following species:
 Ankole African mole-rat (T. ankoliae)
 Mianzini African mole-rat (T. annectens)
 Aberdare Mountains African mole-rat (T. audax)
 Demon African mole-rat (T. daemon)
 Kenyan African mole-rat (T. ibeanus)
 Big-headed African mole-rat (T. macrocephalus)
 Navivasha African mole-rat (T. naivashae)
 King African mole-rat (T. rex)
 Rwanda African mole-rat (T. ruandae)
 Rudd's African mole-rat (T. ruddi)
 Embi African mole-rat (T. spalacinus)
 Northeast African mole-rat (T. splendens)
 Storey's African mole-rat (T. storeyi)

Some authorities place all the species in this genus except T. macrocephalus in one species, the East African mole-rat, in which case T. splendens is used for the entire group. This taxonomy is followed by the IUCN Red List.

References

 
Rodent genera
Taxa named by Eduard Rüppell
Taxonomy articles created by Polbot